The Wisden Leading Woman Cricketer in the World is an annual cricket award selected by the editor of Wisden Cricketers' Almanack. It was established in 2015, to select the best female cricketer based upon their performances anywhere in the world in the previous calendar year.  Prior to the establishment of this dedicated award, women were also eligible for inclusion in Wisden Cricketers of the Year; two were selected, England's Claire Taylor in 2009 and Charlotte Edwards in 2014.

The inaugural recipient of the  Wisden Leading Woman Cricketer in the World was Australian international cricketer Meg Lanning.

The most recent awardee is Australia's Beth Mooney.

Winners

See also
 ICC Women's Cricketer of the Year

References

Cricket awards and rankings
Wisden
Awards established in 2015
Women's cricket-related lists